Mihnea cel Rău (Mihnea the Wrongdoer/Mean/Evil; c.1460 – 12 March 1510), the son of Vlad III Dracula (Vlad Țepeș), and his first wife, was Voivode (Prince) of Wallachia from 1508 to 1509, having replaced his first cousin Radu cel Mare. During his reign, he ruled alongside his son Mircea III Dracul in the year 1509. Unpopular among the boyars, he was overthrown with Ottoman assistance, prompting him to take refuge in Transylvania – where he was to be murdered in front of the Sibiu Cathedral, being buried inside the church.

The fight for the throne
After his father's death, Mihnea ambitiously attempted to succeed him. He organized several raids with the aid of boyars who supported his father and were eager to support his son. In 1508, Mihnea finally succeeded in gaining the throne, but it would not take long for the tainted majority of noblemen to notice the familiar pattern of Wallachian patriotism. Mihnea, like his father, was an exhaustingly driven crusader for Christianity. He too wanted an Eastern Europe free of Turkish rule and aggression. But with corruption in high positions (whether royal or noble), he too would suffer the similar fate of his father.

Family
Historical documents reveal the two women whom Mihnea married. His first wife, Smaranda, died before 1485. His second, Voica, was widowed by Mihnea's assassination. She raised their two sons, Miloș and Mircea III Dracul (who later took the title "Mircea III"), and their daughter Ruxandra, and continued to reside in Sibiu, Transylvania. It is known that Mihnea had taken a preference to his younger son Mircea III Dracul, whom he named after his great-grandfather Mircea cel Bătrân.

His daughter Ruxandra later married Moldavian Prince Bogdan III cel Orb.

He was rumored to have had a second son, "Morsus Atrum", born in 1508, at the beginning of his father’s reign.

"Cel Rău"
Mihnea was dubbed "Cel Rău" meaning "the Bad" or "the Evil One" by Vlad's enemies, the Craiovești faction of boyars. One of Mihnea's most vocal enemies was a monk named Gavril Protul who was an abbot and chronicler of this time period. He described Mihnea's actions as follows: "As soon as Mihnea began to rule he at once abandoned his sheep's clothing and plugged up his ears like an asp.... He took all the greater boyars captive, worked them hard, cruelly confiscated their property, and even slept with their wives in their presence. He cut off the noses and lips of some, others he hanged, and still others drowned." Mihnea retaliated by resorting to his father's terror tactics, but did not reach proportions of his father due to time and opportunity.

Death
After he fled Wallachia in 1510 while being pursued by the Craiovescu faction, he was finally cornered in the Roman Catholic Church of Sibiu where he was attending Mass. As he was leaving the service, he was stabbed by Dimitrije Iakšić, a Serbian partisan of the Craiovescu faction, whose daughter Mihnea raped. Mihnea is buried in this church and his tomb can still be visited today.

Film adaptations
In the film Dark Prince: The True Story of Dracula, Mihnea is portrayed by actor Dan Bordeianu. However, despite its numerous accurate accounts and portrayals, this film was equally fictional in many certain aspects including Vlad Dracula's immortal powers and inaccurate dates. One of these inaccurate aspects was that Mihnea was renamed Vlad in the film. It is documented that Vlad had two other children, one being named Vlad, but in the film, the viewer is only educated about the existence of one son; the son of Vlad Dracula's first wife, which in history is Mihnea.

|-

1460s births
1510 deaths
Year of birth uncertain
16th-century rulers in Europe
Rulers of Wallachia
House of Drăculești